Tony Hedin (born 11 April 1969) is a Swedish handball coach and retired player. He won a bronze medal at the 1993 World Championships, playing alongside his elder brother Robert.

References

1969 births
Living people
Swedish male handball players
Swedish handball coaches